The 2020 Scottish Women's Football Championship was due to be the inaugural season of the Scottish Women's Football Championship after its formation as the third tier of women's football in Scotland.

The league was split into two divisions - Championship North with 12 teams and Championship South with 14 teams. The season started on 9 February 2020. It was due to end in November 2020, but was interrupted by the coronavirus pandemic. In July 2020, the 2020 season was declared null and void. A new season began in October 2020 with the league reverting to a winter season format: 2020–21 Scottish Women's Football Championship

Teams

Championship North

Source: 

Notes

Championship South

Source: 

Notes

Championship North

League table

Results

Championship South

League table

Results

SWPL play-offs
For the first time, a system of promotion/relegation play-offs was to be introduced to the SWPL. The two runners-up from Championship North and Championship South would have taken part in the play-off semi-finals with the winner playing the team finishing eighth in SWPL 2 in the final for the last place in the 2021 Scottish Women's Premier League.

References

External links
 Championship North at SWF
 Championship South at SWF

Scot
Scottish Women's Football Championship seasons
Championship